The Center for Advanced Turbomachinery and Energy Research is an academic research group of the University of Central Florida located in Orlando, Florida, United States. The research conducted here covers several branches of engineering, dedicated to the study of: propulsion, turbine, combustion, and Energy transformation. Corporate partners include Siemens, GE, Alstom, Aerojet Rocketdyne, Embraer, and others.

References

Education in Orange County, Florida